James Byrne VC (1822 – 6 December 1872) was an Irish recipient of the Victoria Cross, the highest and most prestigious award for gallantry in the face of the enemy that can be awarded to British and Commonwealth forces.

Details
Byrne was about 36 years old, and a private in the 86th Regiment of Foot (later the Royal Irish Rifles), British Army during the Indian Mutiny when the following deed took place on 3 April 1858 at Jhansi, India for which he and Captain Henry Edward Jerome were awarded the VC.

Further information
He later achieved the rank of sergeant. He died in north Dublin.

The medal
His Victoria Cross is displayed at The Royal Ulster Rifles Museum in Belfast, Northern Ireland.

References

Listed in order of publication year 
The Register of the Victoria Cross (1981, 1988 and 1997)

Ireland's VCs (Dept of Economic Development, 1995)
Monuments to Courage (David Harvey, 1999)
Irish Winners of the Victoria Cross (Richard Doherty & David Truesdale, 2000)

External links
Location of grave and VC medal (Dublin)

1822 births
1872 deaths
19th-century Irish people
Irish soldiers in the British Army
People from County Wicklow
Irish recipients of the Victoria Cross
Royal Ulster Rifles soldiers
Indian Rebellion of 1857 recipients of the Victoria Cross
Burials at Glasnevin Cemetery
British Army recipients of the Victoria Cross